The Institute of Transportation Studies (ITS) at the University of California's Berkeley, Davis, Irvine, and Los Angeles campuses are centers for research, education, and scholarship in the fields of transportation planning and engineering. Faculty members, staff researchers, and graduate students comprise this multidisciplinary institute network of more than 400 people, which administers an average of $20 million in research funds each year. ITS Berkeley is an organized research unit with nine affiliated organizations and an eight-member advisory council.

Two UC Berkeley academic departments, Civil and Environmental Engineering in the College of Engineering and City and Regional Planning in the College of Environmental Design, offer graduate and undergraduate courses in transportation engineering, planning, policy, economics, and technology, and confer degrees. ITS UC Irvine retains a graduate-only program, and includes faculty and students from the schools of Civil and Environmental Engineering, Economics, and Policy, Planning & Design. ITS provides a means for students to conduct research in their respective academic disciplines. Advisory council members are from the arenas of transportation, government, metropolitan planning, and academia.

The Institute of Transportation Studies was created at UC Berkeley in 1948 by the California state legislature to support the design and construction of the state's transportation system following World War II. Its original mission was "to conduct research and provide instruction to a new generation of transportation professionals" and it still serves that mission today. Alexandre Bayen is the Director.

Research partners include the Division of Research and Innovation at the California Department of Transportation, the Federal Highway Administration, and the Research and Innovative Technology Association at the United States Department of Transportation.

Centers
California Center for Innovative Transportation (CCIT)
California Partners for Advanced Transit and Highways (PATH)
National Center of Excellence for Aviation Operations Research (NEXTOR), sponsored by the Federal Aviation Administration.
Pavement Research Center
Safe Transportation Research and Education Center, (formerly the Traffic Safety Center) joint venture of ITS and the School of Public Health
Transportation Sustainability Research Center
UC Berkeley Center for Future Urban Transport

Technology Transfer Program

The Technology Transfer Program is a division of the Institute of Transportation Studies at the University of California, Berkeley. Tech Transfer brings together transportation research and practice—in planning, design, operations, and maintenance—through education, technical help, field training, and a variety of other resources. Many free and low-cost services are available to California cities, counties, and other public services. Laura Melendy is the current director.

See also
California Center for Innovative Transportation
California Partners for Advanced Transit and Highways (PATH)
National Center of Excellence for Aviation Operators (NEXTOR)
Technology Transfer Program
Transportation Library, UC Berkeley

Sources
Michael Cassidy, Professor, Civil and Environmental Engineering, UC Berkeley Institute of Transportation Studies
Steven Campbell, Assistant Director, UC Berkeley Institute of Transportation Studies
College of Engineering, University of California, Berkeley
College of Environmental Design, University of California, Berkeley
Larry Orcutt, Director, Division of Research and Innovation, Caltrans

External links
Institute of Transportation Studies at the University of California, Berkeley
Institute of Transportation Studies at the University of California, Davis
Institute of Transportation Studies at the University of California, Irvine
Institute of Transportation Studies at the University of California, Los Angeles
ITS Advisory Council

Research institutes in California
University of California, Berkeley
Transportation in California